Kunegunda Weronika Godawska-Olchawa (born July 27, 1951 in Nowy Sącz) is a Polish retired slalom canoeist who competed in the early 1970s. She finished fifth in the K-1 event at the 1972 Summer Olympics in Munich.

References
Sports-reference.com profile

1951 births
Canoeists at the 1972 Summer Olympics
Living people
Olympic canoeists of Poland
Polish female canoeists
Sportspeople from Nowy Sącz